This is a list of awards and nominations received by actor Michael Douglas.

Awards

Notes

See also
 Michael Douglas on stage and screen

References

Bibliography

External links
 Michael Douglas — Awards at the Internet Movie Database

Awards
Lists of awards received by American actor